The European Mariner was a ro-ro freight ferry owned by P&O Irish Sea.

History

European Mariner was launched in 1977 as Salahala for the Salahala Shipping Company. She was chartered by Gilvani for use on the Genoa - Malta - Pireus - Alexandria route. In 1990, she was sold to Crescent Shipping and renamed Merchant Valiant and initially put into service on the Warrenpoint - Heysham route before moving to the Larne - Ardrossan route on charter to Pandoro. She was sold to Pandoro in 1995 and renamed Lion on 15 October 1995. In January 1998, she was transferred to P&O Irish Sea following the merger of Pandoro and P&O European Ferries (Felixstowe) Ltd and she was renamed European Highlander. On 8 November 1999 she ran aground at Ardrossan. A new route was opened in 2001 running from Troon instead of Ardrossan, and European Highlander was renamed European Mariner on 30 June 2001 as the Highlander name was required for a new ship. European Mariner served the Larne - Troon route until January 2002. She then was chartered to various shipping companies in 2002, including Color Line, Commodore Ferries, the Isle of Man Steam Packet Company, Norse Island Ferries and Seatruck Ferries. On 6 November 2002 a lorry was washed overboard in storm conditions  whilst European Mariner was on the Aberdeen -  Lerwick route and she diverted to Invergordon. On 2 December, she came to the aid of the Merchant Venture which suffered an engine failure during a gale. Merchant Venture was escorted to Lerwick. In January 2003, European Mariner returned to service on the Larne - Troon route.

In 2006, European Mariner suffered damage to one of her propeller shafts in an accident at Troon. She ran for a few weeks on only one engine until repairs could be made at Birkenhead. In 2007, European Mariner was chartered to transport blades for wind turbines from Esbjerg that were destined for use on the turbines being erected as part of the Scroby Sands wind farm.

In May 2011 P&O Ferries announced that the European Mariner was to be replaced by the Norcape. The European Mariner operated her last service for P&O between Troon and Larne on 9 July 2011. She sailed for the shipbreakers yard  in Turkey where she beached at Aliağa and scrapped.

References

External links

 Ship details

Ships of Seatruck Ferries
Ferries of the United Kingdom
Merchant ships of the Bahamas
1977 ships
Ships of P&O Ferries